Ivan Audino (born 13 July 1991) is a Swiss professional footballer who last played as a midfielder for Greek Super League 2 club Trikala.

Club career

FK Pohronie
Pohronie announced Audino's signing on 24 October 2020, hours before a Fortuna Liga match against Senica. He became the sole Swiss player in the league, the first to play for Pohronie and a first arrival under Jan Kameník as Pohronie's manager. He made his debut on the same day in the said home fixture coming on as a replacement for Patrik Blahút after 62 minutes of play, with the score set at 1:1 following goals by Dominik Špiriak and Oskar Fotr. Senica, however, took the win, after a goal by former league top-scorer Tomáš Malec less than 10 minutes later.

Audino departed from the club as early as January 2021, following merely 6 appearances.

References

External links
 FK Pohronie official club profile
 Futbalnet profile
 

1991 births
Living people
People from Wetzikon
Swiss men's footballers
Swiss expatriate footballers
Switzerland youth international footballers
Association football midfielders
FC Winterthur players
FC Zürich players
FC Wil players
FC Aarau players
AC Bellinzona players
FK Pohronie players
Trikala F.C. players
Swiss Super League players
Swiss Challenge League players
Swiss Promotion League players
Swiss 1. Liga (football) players
Slovak Super Liga players
Super League Greece 2 players
Swiss expatriate sportspeople in Slovakia
Expatriate footballers in Slovakia
Swiss expatriate sportspeople in Greece
Expatriate footballers in Greece
Sportspeople from the canton of Zürich